Dissident may be:

Dissident - a person who actively opposes an established opinion, policy, or structure
Dissident (song), a song by Pearl Jam
 Dissident (album), a 1991 album by electronic music collective Deadline